The 2018 Africa Men's Sevens was a rugby sevens tournament held in Monastir, Tunisia on 13–14 October 2018. It was the 6th championship in a series that began in 2013.

Pool stage

Pool A

Pool B

Pool C

Pool D

Knockout stage

Cup

Plate

9th Place

Standings

References

2018
2018 rugby sevens competitions
2018 in African rugby union
rugby union
International rugby union competitions hosted by Tunisia